The 1960–61 season was Chelsea Football Club's 47th of competitive football, and their 35th in the English top flight.

Chelsea's performances and results were erratic throughout the season, typified by large victories over Arsenal, Newcastle United and West Bromwich Albion and heavy defeats against Manchester United, Wolverhampton Wanderers and Burnley, culminating in a sixth consecutive mid-table finish since their Championship success in 1955. The club were also victims of an upset in the FA Cup, losing 2–1 at home to Fourth Division side Crewe Alexandra.

The season was nonetheless a watershed in the club's history; frustrated at the club's lack of direction, Chelsea's star player Jimmy Greaves joined AC Milan at the end of the season. Manager Ted Drake, his position weakened by the Crewe result in particular, would also leave the club early into the next season.

Despite the lack of tangible success, the season produced a series of records. Chelsea scored 98 league goals, a record that stood until Chelsea's record breaking 2009–10 season and conceded 100 goals – another club record. Greaves scored 41 league goals, plus another two in the League Cup for a seasonal total of 43, which has never been bettered by another Chelsea player. Greaves also notched six hat-tricks (another club record for a single season), and during the campaign scored his 100th career league goal; at the age of 21, still the youngest ever player to do so.

Results

First Division

FA Cup

League Cup

References
Soccerbase
Hockings, Ron. 100 Years of the Blues: A Statistical History of Chelsea Football Club. (2007)

Chelsea FC Season, 1960-61
Chelsea F.C. seasons